The Nordhausen-Wernigerode Railway Company (Nordhausen-Wernigeroder Eisenbahn-Gesellschaft) or NWE was the second railway company to be founded in the Harz mountains in Germany, after the Gernrode-Harzgerode Railway Company (Gernroder-Harzgeroder Eisenbahn). On  15 June 1896 the NWE was formed by the Vereinigten Eisenbahnbau- und Betriebs-Gesellschaft in Berlin, who also ran its operations. As early as 1896 the first section of this narrow gauge Harz Railway ('Harzquerbahn') was opened, followed in 1898 by the Brocken Railway (Brockenbahn), which was also narrow gauge. On 1 April 1908, the NWE took over operations from the Vereinigten Eisenbahnbau- und Betriebsgesellschaft.

The junction with the Gernroder-Harzgerode railway (the Selke Valley Railway or Selketalbahn) was in Eisfelder Talmühle and that with the South Harz Railway (Südharzeisenbahn) was in Sorge. At Nordhausen and Wernigerode stations there were junctions with the standard gauge trains of the Prussian state railways, later the Deutsche Reichsbahn. At Drei-Annen-Hohne was a connexion with the Halberstadt-Blankenburg railway.

Around 1925 the NWE had about 250 employees and about 100 seasonal workers. From 1926 the NWE also ran bus routes (known as the Harzer Roller or 'Harz rollers'). Its workshop and management was located in Wernigerode.

The NWE was expropriated by a 'people's decision' and went into the Saxony-Anhalt state railways in 1948. The two routes were run by the DR from 1949. Since 1993 the Harz Narrow Gauge Railways (Harzer Schmalspurbahnen) has been the owner and operator of the Harz Railway, Brocken Railway and Selke Valley Railway.

Motive power 

Only on paper were the two Reichsbahn engines 99 5631 and 5632 given the designation NWE Nos. 71 and 72.

See also 
Harz Narrow Gauge Railways

Further reading 
 Gerhard Zieglgänsberger, Hans Röper: Die Harzer Schmalspurbahnen: Die Selketalbahn; Die Harzquer- und Brockenbahn; Die Südharzeisenbahn. transpress Verlag, Stuttgart 1999, 
 Jörg Bauer: 100 Jahre Harzquer- und Brockenbahn. EK-Verlag GmbH, Freiburg 1999,

External links
 

Private railway companies of Germany
Private locomotives of Germany
Metre gauge railways in Germany
Transport in the Harz